The Ontario Clippers, formerly known as the Agua Caliente Clippers of Ontario, are an American professional basketball team in the NBA G League based in Ontario, California, and are affiliated with the Los Angeles Clippers. The team began play in the 2017–18 season.

History
From 2009 to 2014, the Clippers had been affiliated with the former Bakersfield Jam before the Jam switched to a single affiliation with the Phoenix Suns. In December 2015, Doc Rivers, head coach of the Los Angeles Clippers, mentioned the need for the Clippers to own an NBA Development League team.

In April 2017, the Clippers were reported to be looking to add a minor league affiliate in the NBA Development League either in nearby Ontario or Bakersfield for the 2017–18 season.  In May 2017, the Clippers reportedly had settled on the Ontario location and possibly be calling the team the Agua Caliente Clippers. On May 15, the Agua Caliente Clippers of Ontario were announced. The team was named after the Agua Caliente Band of Cahuilla Indians, a federally recognized tribe with resorts and casinos in Palm Springs and are the presenting sponsor of the Clippers.

On July 5, 2022, they officially changed their name to the Ontario Clippers.

On December 22, 2022 they won the 2022 NBA G League Winter Showcase Cup by defeating the Windy City Bulls 99-97.

Season-by-season

Current roster

Radio and television
Play-by-play Brian S. Arrington and Analyst Eddie Talbert, Jr. of Fox Sports 1350 AM/Riverside comprise the television broadcast team.

Coaches

NBA affiliates
 Los Angeles Clippers (2017–present)

Notes

References

External links
 

 
Basketball teams established in 2017
Sports in Ontario, California
Basketball teams in California
Sports in San Bernardino County, California
Sports in the Inland Empire
2017 establishments in California